The Sierra Madre Line was a Pacific Electric interurban route which ran  from the Pacific Electric Building in Los Angeles to Sierra Madre.

History

The line opened to Pasadena on March 1, 1904. Cars were run through on the Lamanda Park Line to Pasadena. The extension to Sierra Madre opened on New Year's Day 1906. On December 3, 1916 the routing through Downtown Los Angeles changed.

Shuttle service for evening trips between Sierra Madre and San Marino began by March 1, 1928 with passengers changing to Monrovia–Glendora Line trains to complete the trip. Starting March 1939 the rear car of some Glendora trains were disconnected to continue to Sierra Madre. This arrangement became the line's only direct Los Angeles service starting February 21, 1943, as all midday service became shuttles and only rush hour cars from Monrovia trains served the line.

Weekend and midday service was discontinued on June 11, 1948 and all trips became shuttles. A single morning outbound trip from Los Angeles was added after November 25, 1949. On October 8, 1950 service was virtually abandoned with a single daily round trip running between Sierra Madre and San Marino; this ended on December 28, 1950. Pacific Electric continued to operate the route with motor coaches after abandonment.

Route
The Sierra Madre Line branched north from the Monrovia–Glendora Line in San Marino and its two tracks ran between the dual roadways passing Lamanda Park Junction (Colorado Street and Sierra Madre Boulevard) where it met the local East Colorado Street Line. From this point, the line continued on single track in a northerly direction along a private right of way in the center of Sierra Madre Boulevard to Michillinda Avenue. There the tracks entered into the pavement of city streets and proceeded on Central Avenue (Sierra Madre Boulevard) to Baldwin Avenue in Sierra Madre where the station was located. It then continued north one and one-half blocks via Baldwin Avenue and turned easterly onto another private right of way (between Montecito Avenue and Highland Avenue) to the end of the line of Mountain Trail Avenue, where a small storage yard was located.

List of major stations

References

Pacific Electric routes
San Gabriel Valley
Sierra Madre, California
San Marino, California
History of Los Angeles County, California
Railway lines opened in 1906
1906 establishments in California
Railway lines closed in 1950
1950 disestablishments in California
Closed railway lines in the United States